June Shirley Kirby (January 5, 1928 – March 6, 2022) was an American actress and model, who spent most of her career as a wardrobe mistress in Hollywood productions' costume departments. She was a showgirl at The Diamond Horseshoe in the late forties and was spotted by Metro-Goldwyn-Mayer which offered her a couple of film parts as a Goldwyn Girl such as in Vincente Minnelli's Kismet (1955) and Joseph L. Mankiewicz's Guys and Dolls (1955) featured opposite Marlon Brando, Larri Thomas and Pat Sheehan. Kirby also performed on Broadway in As the Girls Go (1948-1950), and Gentlemen Prefer Blondes.

Early years
Born in Bay Ridge, Brooklyn, Kirby was raised in Jersey City, New Jersey and earned a diploma at James J. Ferris High School in Jersey City. She later attended Kingston University where she studied fashion.

Modeling
Kirby also worked as a model. In 1946, she was named "posture queen of America" by the National Chiropractic Association. She was in Famous Models Magazine dated June 1950.

Personal life
Kirby dated men such as Mickey Rooney. She married Roy B. Whitlock on August 20, 1960, and they had a daughter named Shawn. Whitlock died on December 23, 1984. She later married Bob Przybysz. Kirby died on March 6, 2022, at the age of 94.

Filmography

Actress

Costume designer

Wardrobe department

Special effects

References

External links
 
 

1928 births
2022 deaths
21st-century American women
Actresses from Jersey City, New Jersey
American film actresses
American models
American musical theatre actresses
James J. Ferris High School alumni
People from Bay Ridge, Brooklyn